Patrick Conway Brown (January 11, 1917 — June 3, 1996) was a Canadian ice hockey player who played 93 games in the National Hockey League with the Detroit Red Wings between 1939 and 1943. The rest of his career, which lasted from 1935 to 1952, was spent in various minor and senior leagues. He was born in Vankleek Hill, Ontario.

Career statistics

Regular season and playoffs

External links

1917 births
1966 deaths
Canadian expatriates in the United States
Canadian ice hockey centres
Cornwall Flyers players
Detroit Red Wings players
Ice hockey people from Ontario
Indianapolis Capitals players
Ottawa Senators (QSHL) players
Pittsburgh Hornets players
Stanley Cup champions
Valleyfield Braves players